Gribova (formerly Nădușita and Nădușița) is a village in Drochia District, Moldova. At the 2004 census, the commune had 2,175 inhabitants.

References

Villages of Drochia District
Soroksky Uyezd
Soroca County (Romania)